The 200 km de Buenos Aires is a 200-kilometre touring car race held annually at Autódromo Juan y Óscar Gálvez in Buenos Aires, Argentina.
The race was traditionally run on the last Sunday in October, but is now held on the first Sunday in October.

The race is form part of Súper TC 2000 calendar.

Winners

External links
TC2000 official website

 
Motorsport competitions in Argentina